Jester Joseph Hairston (July 9, 1901 – January 18, 2000) was an American composer, songwriter, arranger, choral conductor and actor. He was regarded as a leading expert on black spirituals and choral music. His notable compositions include "Amen," a gospel-tinged theme from the film Lilies of the Field and a 1964 hit for the Impressions, and the Christmas song "Mary's Boy Child."

Early life
Hairston was born in Belews Creek, a rural community on the border of Stokes, Forsyth, Rockingham and Guilford counties in North Carolina. His grandparents had been slaves. At an early age, he and his family moved to Homestead, Pennsylvania, just outside Pittsburgh, where he graduated from high school in 1921. Hairston was very young when his father was killed in a job-related accident. Hairston was raised by his grandmother while his mother worked. Hairston heard his grandmother and her friends talking and singing about plantation life and became determined to preserve this history through music.

Hairston initially majored in landscape architecture at Massachusetts Agricultural College in the 1920s. He became involved in various church choirs and choral groups, and accompanist Anna Laura Kidder saw his potential and became his benefactor. Kidder offered Hairston financial assistance to study music at Tufts University, from which he graduated in 1929. He was one of the first black students admitted to Tufts. Later he studied music at the Juilliard School.

Hairston pledged the Chi chapter of the Kappa Alpha Psi fraternity in 1925. He worked as a choir conductor in the early stages of his career. His work with choirs on Broadway eventually led to singing and acting parts in plays, films, radio programs and television shows.

Career
Hairston sang with the Hall Johnson Choir in Harlem for a time but was nearly fired from the all-black choir because he had difficulty with the rural dialects that were used in some of the songs. He had to shed his Boston accent and relearn the country speech of his parents and grandparents. Johnson had told him: "We're singing ain't and cain't and you're singing shahn't and cahn't and they don't mix in a spiritual." The choir performed in many Broadway shows, including The Green Pastures. In 1936, the choir was asked to visit Hollywood to sing for the film The Green Pastures. Russian composer Dimitri Tiomkin heard Hairston and invited him to what would become a 30-year collaboration in which Hairston arranged and collected music for films. In 1939, Hairston married Margaret Swanigan. He wrote and arranged spirituals for Hollywood films as well as for high school and college choirs around the country.

Hairston wrote the song "Mary's Boy Child" in 1956. He also arranged the song "Amen", which he dubbed for the Sidney Poitier film Lilies of the Field, and arranged traditional Negro spirituals. Most of Hairston's film work was in the field of composing, arranging and choral conducting. He also acted in more than 20 films, mostly in small roles, some uncredited. The film roles included some of the early Tarzan films as well as St. Louis Blues, To Kill a Mockingbird, In the Heat of the Night, Lady Sings the Blues, I'm Gonna Git You Sucka and Being John Malkovich. Hairston starred in John Wayne's The Alamo (1960), in which he portrayed "Jethro," a slave owned by  Jim Bowie. 

In 1961, the U.S. State Department appointed Hairston as Goodwill Ambassador. He traveled all over the world teaching and performing the folk music of the slaves. In the 1960s, he held choral festivals with public high-school choirs, introducing them to Negro spiritual music, and sometimes led several hundred students in community performances. His banter about the history of the songs along with his engaging personality and sense of humor endeared him to many students.

During his nationwide travels, Hairston checked local phone books for other Hairstons and reunited many people on his family tree, both black and white. He composed more than 300 spirituals. He was the recipient of many honorary doctorates, including a doctorate from the University of Massachusetts in 1972 and a doctorate in music from Tufts in 1977.

Hairston appeared on the television situation comedy The Amos 'n' Andy Show as society sophisticate Henry Van Porter and portrayed the character of Leroy on both the radio and television Amos 'n' Andy programs. He also played the role of Wildcat on the show That's My Mama. In his senior years, he appeared on the show Amen as Rolly Forbes. His last television appearance was in 1993 on an episode of Family Matters. Hairston also played the role of "King Moses" on radio for the Humphrey Bogart and Lauren Bacall show Bold Venture.

In his later years, Hairston served as a cultural ambassador for American music, traveling to numerous countries with choral groups that he had assembled. In 1985, he took the Jester Hairston Chorale, a multiracial group, to sing in China at a time when foreign visitors would rarely appear there.

Death
Hairston died in Los Angeles of natural causes in 2000 at age 98. For his contribution to the television industry, Hairston has a star on the Hollywood Walk of Fame located at 6201 Hollywood Boulevard. He is interred at Inglewood Park Cemetery, Inglewood, California.

Filmography

Notes

References

Sources cited

External links

African American Registry biography
 

1901 births
2000 deaths
People from Forsyth County, North Carolina
Male actors from North Carolina
Male actors from Pennsylvania
African-American male actors
African-American songwriters
African-American composers
African-American male composers
American male film actors
American male radio actors
American male television actors
Burials at Inglewood Park Cemetery
Juilliard School alumni
People from Allegheny County, Pennsylvania
People from Homestead, Pennsylvania
Tufts University alumni
20th-century American male actors
Songwriters from Pennsylvania
Songwriters from North Carolina
20th-century American composers
20th-century American male musicians
20th-century African-American musicians
American male songwriters